John Vitale may refer to:
 John Vitale (American football)
 John Vitale (mobster)